Top Country Albums is a chart that ranks the top-performing country music albums in the United States, published by Billboard.  In 2014, 29 different albums topped the chart; placings were based on electronic point of sale data from retail outlets.

In the issue of Billboard dated January 4, Garth Brooks was at number one with Blame It All on My Roots: Five Decades of Influences, its fourth week in the top spot.  It remained atop the chart the following week before being displaced by Crash My Party by Luke Bryan.  Brooks and Bryan were among four acts to have two number ones during the year: Brooks returned to number one in December with Man Against Machine and Bryan spent a single week in the top spot with Spring Break 6...Like We Ain't Ever, the latest in an annual series of spring break-themed releases by the singer.  The duo Florida Georgia Line spent time at number one with both Here's to the Good Times and Anything Goes.  Blake Shelton spent one week at number one with Based on a True Story..., which had originally topped the chart more than a year earlier, and the same length of time with his next album Bringing Back the Sunshine.

Several of 2014's chart-topping acts, including Luke Bryan, Florida Georgia Line, Jason Aldean and Chase Rice, were associated with the so-called bro-country style, a sub-genre which incorporated influences from rock music and hip hop and often featured lyrics relating to partying, attractive young women, and pick-up trucks.  Rice was one of a number of acts to reach number one for the first time in 2014, when he topped the listing with Ignite the Night in September.  In February, Jennifer Nettles of the band Sugarland achieved her first solo chart-topper with That Girl.  In March the Eli Young Band achieved the same feat with 10,000 Towns, as did Dan + Shay in April with Where It All Began.  Brantley Gilbert was another first-time chart-topper in June with Just as I Am, as were Lee Brice in September with I Don't Dance and Sam Hunt in November with Montevallo.  In April, Country Music Hall of Fame member Johnny Cash, who had died in 2003, gained a posthumous number one with Out Among the Stars, an album of previously-unreleased material recorded in the 1980s.

Chart history

See also
2014 in music
List of number-one country singles of 2014 (U.S.)

References

2014
United States Country Albums